Alfred Alexander Lefurgey (April 22, 1871 – November 11, 1934) was a Canadian lawyer and politician.

Born in Summerside, Prince Edward Island, the son of John Lefurgey, Lefurgey was educated at St. Dunstan's College, Mount Allison University (B.A. in 1891) and Harvard Law School (LL.B in 1894). He returned to Summerside where he entered his father's ship building and shipping business with his brother, John Ephraim.

Lefurgey was first elected to the Legislative Assembly of Prince Edward Island for 5th Prince in 1897. Lefurgey resigned his seat in 1898 to run unsuccessfully for a federal seat in 1898. He was elected to the House of Commons of Canada for East Prince in the general elections of 1900 and re-elected in 1904 for Prince. A Conservative, he was defeated in 1908 and again in 1917. In the House of Commons, he served as Conservative whip for the Maritime provinces.

Lefurgey was a prominent member in the Masonic order.

References
 
 The Canadian Parliament; biographical sketches and photo-engravures of the senators and members of the House of Commons of Canada. Being the tenth Parliament, elected November 3, 1904
Past and Present of Prince Edward Island ..., DA MacKinnon & AB Warburton (1906)

1871 births
1934 deaths
Harvard Law School alumni
Conservative Party of Canada (1867–1942) MPs
Members of the House of Commons of Canada from Prince Edward Island
Mount Allison University alumni
Progressive Conservative Party of Prince Edward Island MLAs
People from Summerside, Prince Edward Island